Nationalist Coalition (CN) was a Spanish electoral list in the European Parliament election in 1989 made up from centre-right peripheral nationalist parties. It was the successor of the 1987 Europeanist Union.

Composition

Electoral performance

European Parliament

Defunct political party alliances in Spain
Regionalist parties in Spain